3090 may refer to:

In general
 3090, a number in the 3000 (number) range
 A.D. 3090, a year of the 4th millennium CE
 3090 BC, a year in the 4th millennium BCE

Roads numbered 3090
 Hawaii Route 3090, a state highway
 Louisiana Highway 3090, a state highway
 Texas Farm to Market Road 3090, a state highway
 A3090 road, in the UK

Other uses
 3090 Tjossem, an asteroid in the Asteroid Belt, the 3090th asteroid registered
 IBM 3090, a mainframe computer

See also